Boardman Township may refer to the following places in the United States:

 Boardman Township, Clayton County, Iowa
 Boardman Township, Michigan
 Boardman Township, Ohio